Acarmantaş is a village in the District of Kozan, Adana Province, Turkey. It had a population of 1,148 people as of 2000.

References

Villages in Kozan District